Chennai 2 Singapore is the soundtrack album for the 2017 Tamil film of the same name directed by Abbas Akbar. The soundtrack and score for the film is composed by Ghibran who planned to release the film's audio in six different countries via road travel, which is something unique for a South Indian film. The album featuring six tracks were released one by one so as to cover all six countries through this drive.

The promotional audio drive began on 1 June 2016 and ended on 31 July 2016, in which the team started its drive from Chennai and travelled to Bhutan, Myanmar, Thailand, Malaysia and the drive ended in Singapore. The album also released in streaming platforms, with an exclusive iTunes release on 1 August 2016 and in all platforms on 15 August, and was released in CD on 5 September. The songs opened with mixed reviews from critics but was well received by audience for its "city based numbers" in the music album. The first song "Vaadi Vaadi" opened with positive response from audiences and eventually  topped the charts in all radio stations and music streaming services.

Background 
As the film features newcomers in the lead, Ghibran decided to plan for a unique marketing strategies for the audio release; he experienced it during the album release of Uttama Villain (which Ghibran had composed) with Kamal Haasan releasing the album through an online application. The composer worked on six tracks for the film in October 2015 and recording of the songs began in December 2015. The album also featured new lyricists and playback singers working on the film's soundtrack. Think Music purchased the film's audio rights in the same month.

In January 2016, Ghibran announced plans for the film's music release that the album – featuring six tracks in total – will be released in six countries connecting India and Singapore. He revealed that since the album features six tracks, each tracks will be released one by one so that the team would cover all the countries. The composer eventually stated that he will start his road trip from Chennai to Singapore crossing Bhutan, Myanmar, Thailand and Malaysia. The team also planned to release the album within a span of 20 days in the road trip. Engaging his fans and friends through his social media pages, Ghibran asked for advice about the road trip. He also sent a wish for Ajith Kumar known for his road skills to offer his advice.

Marketing and release 
The historic audio drive flag-off event began on 1 June 2016 at Sathyam Cinemas in Chennai, with Suriya being the chief guest for the event. In order to promote the release, the teaser of the first song "Vaadi Vaadi" was unveiled on 25 May 2016, with the full song being unveiled on 1 June, the same day when the event started. Ghibran described it as a "formula dream song in the Western genre", which is said to be a "relaxed" and "feel good song".

Ghibran along with the film's director Abbas Akbar, cinematographer Karthik Nallamuthu, Shiv Keshav who was the media manager in charge of social-media updates about the trip, and the composer's assistant Aravind were part of the audio drive. During the drive, Ghibran also worked in other projects so he made a mini studio set-up in his car along with battery backup. Starting with Chennai, the team drove to Vijayawada, Kolkata, Guwahati, Assam, Nagaland and then to Manipur, from there the team proceeded to Bhutan, Myanmar, Thailand, Malaysia and Singapore. The second song "Poda" was released in Bhutan on 13 June, which was sung by actor RJ Balaji, in his maiden attempt in playback singing.

The team further faced challenges during the road trip with natural calamities and last minute document cancellations. As the team reached Myanmar during 20 June, an earthquake of 7.4 magnitude had occurred causing Ghibran to cancel the trip midway, but they eventually proceeded the release following the support of his technical team. The third song "Pogadhe" which is said to be a "melancholic number" by Ghibran was released on 23 June 2016 at Myanmar.

On 29 June 2016, the team was shocked to know that the entire songs have been leaked and made available online. Ghibran released a heartfelt note describing the challenges they faced during the trip and also being overwhelmed by the reception of the songs. But also being upset about the leak, he expressed the fans not to download the songs from piracy sites. However, the team released the song "Texas Pogiren" in Thailand on the following day, 30 June 2016, which was touted to be a "whacky number". Later the team released two more songs –  "Gun Inbam" in Malaysia on 5 July and the final song "Ro Ro Roshini" was released in Singapore on 15 July. To accommodate the success of the audio drive, the female version of "Pogadhe" was unveiled as a bonus track on 31 July 2016 in Chennai.

Track listing 
Despite all the songs being released as singles, the album in its entirety was released in iTunes exclusively on 1 August 2016, and in other streaming platforms on 15 August. The album was released through CD formats on 5 September 2016. The first three songs in the album appeared in the film, whereas the rest of the songs were not featured.

Reception 
The event garnered an outstanding media presence and wide publicity for the film and its prolific efforts to release each single, with Kamal Haasan and Rajinikanth amongst other celebrities praised Ghibran's initiative for the offbeat promotions of the soundtrack. Rajinikanth also reviewed two of its songs from the soundtrack and found it very impressive.

Chart performance 
The first song "Vaadi Vaadi" which released in Chennai on 1 June 2016, topped the charts on the popular radio station, Radio Mirchi for over a week in June 2016 and then went on to top the weekly charts on other stations such as Big FM, Radio City, and Suryan FM. It also took the top spot during the overall airplay across all radio stations in Chennai during June and July 2016. The complete soundtrack of Chennai 2 Singapore was positioned #1 on iTunes Store due to its "snazzy city-styled numbers" and Apple Music chose "Vaadi Vaadi" as its best song of the week in August 2016.

Critical response 
Reviewing for the film's soundtrack, Behindwoods gave 2.75 out of 5 and stated it as "a trendy album from Ghibran which suits the film's theme perfectly", however it further stated that "the repetitive factor in the tunes could have been avoided". Moviecrow further summarised "Ghibran continues to push boundaries in term of musical quality irrespective of the scope of the project and Chennai 2 Singapore is not different" and gave a rating of 3.25 out of 5. Indiaglitz gave a rating of 3 out of 5 stating "Ghibran gets you hooked". Karthik Srinivasan of Milliblog further added "Chennai 2 Singapore's hyper-inventive soundtrack is Ghibran's mic drop moment!"

Other versions 
Ghibran performed a concert version of the song "Vaadi Vaadi" which was released on 21 May 2020, during the nationwide lockdown due to COVID-19 pandemic.

References 

2016 soundtrack albums
Tamil film soundtracks
Soundtracks by Indian artists